Ascerodes prochlora is a species of moth of the family Tortricidae. It is found in New Zealand.

The larvae feed on Aciphylla species and Senecio lyalli. They bore into the rootstock of their host plant.

References

Archipini
Moths described in 1905
Moths of New Zealand
Taxa named by Edward Meyrick